Koblenzer Brauerei (formerly Königsbacher Brauerei GmbH & Co KG) is a brewery in Koblenz, in the Rhineland-Palatinate state of Germany. Since its foundation in 1689, it has a tradition of brewing beer in the Old Brewery (Altes Brauhaus) in the historic center of Koblenz. In 1992, the Königsbacher Brewery was taken over by the Karlsberg Group. The Königsbacher Brewery's brands, but not the brewery building, were sold to the Bitburger brewery in early 2010. The brewery was sold and re-incorporated in 2012.

Overview

The former name comes from a small river near Koblenz named Königsbach (King's Brook), whose clear water was suitable for brewing beer: "Königsbacher" is German for "from the Königsbach" (from the King's Brook).

Products include:
 Königsbacher Pilsener (a pilsener beer)
 Königsbacher Export
 Königsbacher 1689
 Nette Edel Pils (after the Rhine's Nette River)
 Zischke Kellerbier
 Königsbacher Radler
 Königsbacher Mai-Bock
 Königsbacher Fest-Bock

Sponsoring:
 The Königsbacher Brewery is a big sponsor for some sportsclubs of Koblenz, such as the TuS Koblenz football club (soccer).

See also

 List of brewing companies in Germany

References

External links

  Koblenzer.de (official website)
 

Breweries in Germany
Beer brands of Germany
1689 establishments in the Holy Roman Empire